Rail Ayratovich Zaripov (born 25 May 1995) is a Russian football player.

Club career
He made his debut in the Russian Football National League for FC Gazovik Orenburg on 23 November 2013 in a game against FC Dynamo Saint Petersburg.

References

External links

Career summary by sportbox.ru

1995 births
Living people
Russian footballers
Association football midfielders
FC KAMAZ Naberezhnye Chelny players
FC Orenburg players
Sportspeople from Tatarstan